The 1974 FIFA World Cup final was the final match of the 1974 FIFA World Cup held in Munich, Germany (formerly West Germany). It was the 10th FIFA World Cup competition, held to determine the world champion among national men's football sides. The match was contested by the Netherlands and West Germany, with West Germany winning 2–1. The Netherlands opened the scoring via a Johan Neeskens penalty in the second minute, only for Paul Breitner to equalise with another penalty in the 25th minute before Gerd Müller scored the winning goal in the 43rd minute, claiming West Germany's second FIFA World Cup.

Five German players (Sepp Maier, Franz Beckenbauer, Wolfgang Overath, Jürgen Grabowski and Horst-Dieter Höttges) became the first in history to have won gold, silver and bronze medals at the FIFA World Cup.

Route to the final

Match

Summary

West Germany was led by Franz Beckenbauer, while the Dutch had their star Johan Cruyff and their Total Football system, which had dazzled the competition. The start of the match was delayed as the ground staff at the stadium had removed the corner flags for the tournament's closing ceremony (which preceded the final) but then forgot to put them back. With just a minute gone, Cruyff was brought down by Uli Hoeneß in the German penalty area following a solo run, and the Dutch took the lead from the ensuing penalty by Johan Neeskens before any German player had even touched the ball. West Germany struggled to recover, but they were awarded a penalty of their own in the 25th minute after Bernd Hölzenbein was fouled within the Dutch area. Paul Breitner took responsibility for the kick and scored. These two penalties were the first to be awarded in a World Cup Final. West Germany now pushed for a winner, which eventually came in the 43rd minute through Gerd Müller.

It turned out to be Müller's last goal for the West German team, as he retired from international football after the tournament. As the teams walked off the pitch at half-time, Cruyff was booked for arguing with the referee.

The second half saw chances for both sides. Müller thought he had scored when he put the ball in the net, only to be denied by the linesman flagging for offside. In the 85th minute, Hölzenbein fell to ground in the Dutch penalty area again, but referee Taylor did not believe it was a foul. When the final whistle went, West Germany were crowned world champions for 1974, in addition to their European title from 1972. This was the only case of the reigning European champions winning the World Cup until Spain accomplished the feat in 2010, although France have also held both trophies at the same time by winning the 1998 World Cup followed by Euro 2000.

The Brazilian João Havelange (FIFA President from 1974 to 1998) made an unsubstantiated claim that the 1966 and 1974 World Cups were fixed so that England and West Germany would win respectively.

Berti Vogts, back then playing for West Germany, declared in 1997 that the penalty awarded to West Germany was unjustified. However, he remains the only one in the team who wants to comment on it.

Details

See also
Germany–Netherlands football rivalry

References

Final
1974
1974
1974
Final
Final
Sports competitions in Munich
July 1974 sports events in Europe
1970s in Munich
Association football matches in Germany
Netherlands–West Germany relations